William Bonnell (February 1, 1804 – October 12, 1865) was an American portrait painter. His works are generally placed in the folk art category, due to his lack of formal training.

Biography
Born in Clinton, New Jersey, Bonnell was the second son of Colonel Clement Bonnell (1766-1836) and Rachel Wolverton. His grandfather was the Revolutionary War Colonel Abraham Bonnell (1732-1797), the proprietor of a tavern that was one of the first recruiting places for minutemen in that area. He married Margaret Hinchman (1813-1901) in 1836.

As of now, only twenty paintings of his are known to exist, most inscribed with his name and a date on the reverse. An unsigned painting of a hunting dog with the unlikely name of "Chustetunk's Frosty Ferris" may be his first canvas. His first signed and dated works are from 1823. Traditionally, a sign that was originally in Hampton at the Perryville Inn, with Andrew Jackson and an American flag,  is credited to him, but he was not known as a sign painter. Most of his works date from c.1825, when he painted the likenesses of several Hunterdon County residents.

Only one painting from outside New Jersey is attested to; showing Andrew and Eliza Everhart Yerkes; farmers in Warminster, Pennsylvania. No works after c.1835 have been discovered. His proficiency shows a distinct improvement over the course of his career; including the addition of background landscapes.

Some of his works may be seen at the Art Institute of Chicago. The sign is at the Hunterdon County Historical Association in Flemington.

References

External links

 Bonnell @ the Schwarz gallery

1804 births
1865 deaths
19th-century American painters
American portrait painters
Artists from New Jersey
People from Clinton, New Jersey